Zhulād of Gōzgān (Bactrian script: ζoλooo γωζoγoνo, ruled circa 658-688 or 690-720 CE) was a ruler of the mid-7th century CE, in the region of Guzgan in northern Afghanistan, then part of Tokharistan. His name "Zhulad" suggests Iranian ethnicity, but his territory was nominally under the control of the Western Turks until 657 CE, after which the Western Turks submitted to the Chinese Tang Dynasty, letting their territories become protectorates of the Chinese. Administratively and militarily, Zhulād of Gōzgān was a vassal of the Turk Yabghus of Tokharistan, themselves a nominal protectorate of Tang China.

As attested by legal documents that have tentatively been dated to the late 7th and early 8th centuries, the area was controlled by a local family that used the country Gozgan as the dynastic name, a custom of the era. Several are named, including Zhulad Gozgan, Skag Gozgan and Yan Gozgan, presumably two of his successors.

Zhulād of Gōzgān issued coins in the region of Ambēr (Sar-i Pol). Some of his coins display the bismillāh symbol, suggesting a possible affiliation with the Muslims. Zhulād of Gōzgān issued trilingual coinage, in Arabic, Pahlavi, and Bactrian.

Guzgan was conquered by the Arabs under al-Ahnaf ibn Qays in 653/4, as part of the Muslim conquest of Persia. But during the rule of the Umayyad caliph Ali (656–661), the Arabs were expelled from eastern Iran, as far as Nishapur. The Sasanian Peroz III was able to establish some level of control with the help of the yabghu of Tokharistan in Seistan. The Western Turkic Khaganate itself was taken over by the Tang Dynasty in 657 CE, and most of his territories became protectorates of the Tang Empire, and organized into regional commanderies, as was the case for the region of Guzgan. 

While the Tang Dynasty held nominal control, actual administrative control of the region was apparently held by the Yabghus of Tokharistan, themselves a protectorate of Tang China. According to the chronicles of the Chinese Cefu Yuangui, a young brother of Yabghu Pantu Nili named Puluo (僕羅 in Chinese sources) visited the Tang court in 718 and gave an account of the military forces in the Tokharistan region. Puluo described the power of "the Kings of Tokharistan", explaining that "two hundred and twelve kingdoms, governors and prefects" recognize the authority of the Yabghus, and that it has been so since the time of his grandfather, that is, probably since the time of the establishment of the Yabghus of Tokharistan. The territory of Guzgan was also mentioned among the territories controlled by the Yabghus. Puluo finally reaffirmed the loyalty of Yabghu Pantu Nili towards the Tang Dynasty. 

Part of the Chinese entry for this account by Puluo is:

In 737, the area was the site of the decisive Battle of Kharistan between the Arabs under Asad ibn Abdallah al-Qasri, and the Turgesh under the khagan Suluk. In 743, the Alid Yahya ibn Zayd, son of Zayd ibn Ali, rose in revolt but was defeated and killed at Guzgan by the Umayyad governor, Nasr ibn Sayyar. His tomb was later a site of pilgrimage. In Abbasid times, the local governor resided in Anbar, possibly modern Sar-e Pol, but other accounts mention Shibarghan as the capital, and the geographers al-Muqaddasi and Yaqut al-Hamawi considered al-Yahudiyya (modern Maynama) as the capital.

References

Notes

Sources
 
 
 
 

Rulers of Guzgan
7th-century monarchs in Asia
8th-century monarchs in Asia